Miss Venezuela 1955 was the third edition of Miss Venezuela pageant held at Tamanaco Intercontinental Hotel in Caracas, Venezuela, on July 9, 1955. The winner of the pageant was Susana Duijm, Miss Miranda, who competed in Miss World 1955 and won the crown.

Results
Miss Venezuela 1955 - Susana Duijm (Miss Miranda)
1st runner-up - Ivonne Cisneros (Miss Bolívar)
2nd runner-up - Mireya Casas (Miss Distrito Federal)

Delegates

 Miss Bolívar - Ivonne Cisneros Barceló
 Miss Distrito Federal - Mireya Casas Robles
 Miss Mérida - Cecilia Useche Hardy
 Miss Miranda - Susana Duijm Zubillaga
 Miss Monagas - Helena Quilart Navarro
 Miss Nueva Esparta - Elka Pérez Hernández
 Miss Portuguesa - Mary González
 Miss Sucre - Teresa Estrella Villaroel
 Miss Trujillo - Helena Casas Briceño
 Miss Yaracuy - Chelo Avellaneda Valery
 Miss Zulia - Magaly Dupuy Ortega

External links
Miss Venezuela official website

1955 beauty pageants
1955 in Venezuela